The 4th Cabinet of North Korea was elected by the 1st Session of the 4th Supreme People's Assembly on 16 December 1967. It was replaced on 26 December 1972 by the 5th Administrative Council.

Members

References

Citations

Bibliography
Books:
 

4th Supreme People's Assembly
Cabinet of North Korea
1967 establishments in North Korea
1972 disestablishments in North Korea